"World So Cold" is the third single released from Three Days Grace's 2009 album, Life Starts Now. The song was released for radio airplay on August 3, 2010. The single debuted on the Billboard Rock Songs chart at number 50 and has reached number one on the Hot Mainstream Rock Tracks chart.

Composition
The song runs at 140 BPM and is in the key of G# major. It runs for four minutes and three seconds. It was written by Adam Gontier and produced by Howard Benson.

Personnel
 Adam Gontier – lead vocals, rhythm guitar 
 Neil Sanderson – drums, keyboards, backing vocals
 Brad Walst – bass guitar
 Barry Stock – lead guitar

Charts

Weekly charts

Year-end charts

Certifications

Other variations
"World So Cold (piano version)" was released on the Japanese edition of Life Starts Now and on the downloadable single for "Lost in You".

Before the album was released, the band put a piano version without any vocals on their website.

References

External links

2009 songs
2010 singles
Three Days Grace songs
Songs written by Adam Gontier
Jive Records singles
Song recordings produced by Howard Benson